The 1922–23 Scottish Division One season was won by Rangers by five points over nearest rival Airdrieonians. Albion Rovers and Alloa Athletic finished 19th and 20th respectively and were relegated to the 1923–24 Scottish Division Two.

League table

Results

References

Scottish Football Archive

1922–23 Scottish Football League
Scottish Division One seasons